A like button, like option, or recommend button, is a feature in communication software such as social networking services, Internet forums, news websites and blogs where the user can express that they like, enjoy or support certain content. Internet services that feature like buttons usually display the number of users who liked each content, and may show a full or partial list of them. This is a quantitative alternative to other methods of expressing reaction to content, like writing a reply text. Some websites also include a dislike button, so the user can either vote in favor, against or neutrally. Other websites include more complex web content voting systems. For example, five stars or reaction buttons to show a wider range of emotion to the content.

Implementations

Vimeo 
Video sharing site Vimeo added a "like" button in November 2005. Developer Andrew Pile describes it as an iteration of the "digg" button from the site Digg.com, saying "We liked the Digg concept, but we didn't want to call it 'Diggs,' so we came up with 'Likes'".

FriendFeed 
The like button on FriendFeed was announced as a feature on October 30, 2007 and was popularized within that community. Later the feature was integrated into Facebook before FriendFeed was acquired by Facebook on August 10, 2009.

Facebook

The Facebook like button is designed as a hand giving "thumbs up". It was originally discussed to have been a star or a plus sign, and during development the feature was referred to as "awesome" instead of "like". It was introduced on 9 February 2009. In February 2016, Facebook introduced reactions - a new way to express peoples emotions to Facebook posts. Some reactions included "Love", "Haha", "Wow", "Sad", or "Angry". 

The like button is a significant power sharing tool, as one "like" will make the post show up on friends' feed, boosting the algorithm to ensure the post is seen and interacted with in order to continue the cycle of engagement.
On the other hand, a study highlights the disadvantage of the “like” reaction in algorithmic content ranking on Facebook. The "like” button can increase the engagement, but can decrease the organic reach as a “brake effect of viral reach”.

YouTube
In 2010, as part of a wider redesign of the service, YouTube switched from a star-based rating system to Like/Dislike buttons. Under the previous system, users could rate videos on a scale from 1 to 5 stars; YouTube staff argued that this change reflected common usage of the system, as 2-, 3-, and 4-star ratings were not used as often. In 2012, YouTube briefly experimented with replacing the Like and Dislike buttons with a Google+ +1 button.

In 2019, after the backlash from YouTube Rewind 2018, YouTube began considering options to combat "dislike mobs," including an option to completely remove the dislike button. The video is the most disliked video on YouTube, passing the music video for Justin Bieber's "Baby". On November 12, 2021, YouTube announced it will make dislike counts private, with only the content creator being able to view the number of dislikes on the back end, in what the company says is an effort to combat targeted dislike and harassment campaigns and encourage smaller content creators.

Google+

Google+ had a like button called the +1 (Internet jargon for "I like that" or "I agree"), which was introduced in June 2011. In August 2011, the +1 button also became a share icon.

Reddit
On Reddit (a system of message boards), users can upvote and downvote posts (and comments on posts). The votes contribute to posters' and commenters' "karma" (Reddit's name for a user's overall rating).

Twitter
Alongside "retweets", Twitter users could "favorite" posts made on the service, indicated by a gold star symbol. In November 2015, to alleviate user confusion and put the function more in line with other social networks, the "favorite" function was renamed "like", and its button was changed from a star symbol to a heart.

VK
VK like buttons for posts, comments, media and external sites operate in a different way from Facebook. Liked content doesn't get automatically pushed to the user's wall, but is saved in the (private) Favorites section instead.

Instagram
The Instagram like button is indicated by a heart symbol. In addition to tapping the heart symbol on a post, users can double tap an image to "like" it. In May 2019, Instagram began tests wherein the number of likes on a user's post is hidden from other users.

TikTok
The TikTok like button is indicated by a heart symbol, and users can use the like button by double tapping on a post they like, similar to Instagram. Liked content can be accessed via the "Liked" tab on a user's profile.

XWiki 

XWiki, the application wiki and open source collaborative platform, added the « Like » button in version 12.7. This button allows users to like wiki pages. It's possible to see all liked pages and the Like counter for each page.

Legal issues
In 2017, a man was fined 4,000 Swiss francs by a Swiss regional court for liking defamatory messages on Facebook written by other people which criticized an activist. According to the court, the defendant "clearly endorsed the unseemly content and made it his own".

See also
 Likejacking
 Moderation system
 Recommender system
Surfbook
 Trust metric

References

Social software
Software features
2000s neologisms